Wawrzyniec Dayczak (August 27, 1882 – April 28, 1968) was a Polish architect and independence activist.

Dayczak was born on August 27, 1882 in the region of Podolia, in a village of Reniów near the town of Załoźce (Zaliztsi) in the former Ternopil Province. He was the oldest son of a peasant named Maciej (Matthias). After graduating from the classical gymnasium in Brody, he studied at the Technical University of Lviv Faculty of Architecture, completing his diploma in 1915. In the gymnasium, he established contact with the clandestine inter-partitional organization, Association of the Polish Youth "Zet". These activities continued in the study period from 1904 to be in the next year to highest ranks of Zet: "Koło Brackie „Zetu”" (Zet Fraternity). In 1905 he courier to Warsaw, participating in the preparatory work for a students' strike. Simultaneously he worked as an activist within the eastern section of inter-partitional socio-educational organization . In 1908 he founded  -Poland's first period of independence partitions organization of rural youth. He was the Chief of Headquarters Teams Bartoszowych. After graduating in 1915, he was appointed to the Austrian army.

He was a member of the General Headquarters of Defence Lvov, head of the Polish mobilization of Military Personnel in Lvov in 1918 [1]. In early 1919, he was seconded to Warsaw in connection with the formulation of the relief. In 1920, he was a volunteer army in Lviv. He designed and built about 100 churches. Churches his mostly rural churches. In the years 1945-1964 continued to teach in the field of architecture and construction at the State School Building in Jarosław. He died on April 28, 1968 in Jarosław and was buried at Powązki Cemetery in Warsaw.

Further reading
"'Z dni wielkich przemian': wspomnienia architekta Wawrzyńca Dayczaka (1882-1968)", by Maria Dayczak-Domanasiewicz, Wawrzyniec Dayczak

1882 births
1968 deaths
People from Ternopil Oblast
People from Jarosław
Polish independence activists
Architects from Lviv
Lviv Polytechnic alumni
People from the Kingdom of Galicia and Lodomeria
Polish Austro-Hungarians